D. plicata may refer to:
 Dolomena plicata, the pigeon conch, a sea snail species
 Digama plicata, a moth species found in Africa

See also
 Plicata (disambiguation)